San Isidro is a settlement in Río Quito Municipality, Chocó Department in Colombia.

Climate
San Isidro has a very wet tropical rainforest climate (Af). .

References

Chocó Department